Rebirth is the fourth album by the Brazilian heavy metal band Angra, the first since a major restructuring of the band's line-up. In 2019, Metal Hammer ranked it as the 15th best power metal album of all time.

Track listing

Bonus track for Japan

Personnel
Band members
Edu Falaschi – lead and backing vocals, vocal arrangements
Kiko Loureiro – lead guitar, acoustic guitar on "Rebirth", backing vocals, keyboard arrangements
Rafael Bittencourt – rhythm guitar, acoustic guitar on "Rebirth", backing vocals, keyboard arrangements, strings and vocal arrangements
Felipe Andreoli – bass, backing vocals
Aquiles Priester – drums

Additional musicians
Gunter Werno – piano, keyboards
Andre Kbelo, Zeka Loureiro, Maria Rita, Carolin Wols – backing vocals
Roman Mekinulov – cello
Douglas Las Casas – percussion
Mestre Dinho & Grupo Woyekè – Maracatu voices on "Unholy Wars"

Production
Dennis Ward – producer, engineer, mixing, choir arrangements
Andre Kbelo – assistant engineer
Jürgen Lusky – mastering
Antonio D. Pirani – executive producer

Charts

References

Angra (band) albums
2001 albums
Concept albums
Albums produced by Dennis Ward (musician)
SPV/Steamhammer albums